Bernard Renault is a French former slalom canoeist who competed from the mid-1970s to the mid-1980s.

He won two medals in the K-1 team event at the ICF Canoe Slalom World Championships with a gold in 1977 and a bronze in 1981.

References
Overview of athlete's results at canoeslalom.net

French male canoeists
Living people
Year of birth missing (living people)
Medalists at the ICF Canoe Slalom World Championships